Queen Liz was the pseudonym of an American thief and pickpocket who was a prominent member of New York's underworld during the mid-to late 19th century. She was among the elite "inner circle" of female career criminals under Marm Mandelbaum during the 1860s and 1870s. Among these included fellow thieves, blackmailers and confidence women such as Lena Kleinschmidt, Sophie Lyons, Kid Glove Rosey, Little Annie, Big Mary and Old Mother Hubbard, all of whom were regular guests at her extravagant dinner parties.

References

Further reading
Byrnes, Thomas. 1886 Professional Criminals of America. New York: Chelsea House Publishers, 1969.
Petronius. New York Unexpurgated: An Amoral Guide for the Jaded, Tired, Evil, Non-conforming, Corrupt, Condemned, and the Curious, Humans and Otherwise, to Under Underground Manhattan. New York: Matrix House, 1966.

Year of birth missing
Year of death missing
Criminals from New York City